Day of Missile Forces and Artillery is a holiday celebrated in Russia and Belarus on 19 November.

History 

The holiday was first established by a Presidium of Supreme Soviet of the Soviet Union decree on 21 October 1944 as Artillery day of Red Army. The date was chosen because the Red Army began their successful counter-attack (Operation Uranus) in the battle of Stalingrad  on 19 November 1942, with much help from the artillery of the Red Army.

Since 1964, the holiday bears its present name.

In modern Russia, the holiday has the status of memorable day.

References 

November observances
Observances in Russia
Autumn events in Russia